John Oliver Probe (24 December 1900 – 29 September 1964) was a Co-operative Commonwealth Federation member of the House of Commons of Canada. He was born in Weyburn, Saskatchewan, and became a teacher by career.

Probe served in the military for World War II at various postings. He attended the University of Saskatchewan and received a Bachelor of Arts, Collegiate Certificate in Education, Math Specialist.

He was first elected to Parliament at the Regina City riding in the 1945 general election after an unsuccessful attempt in 1940. Probe was defeated in the 1949 election by Emmett McCusker of the Liberal Party.

References

External links
 

1900 births
1964 deaths
Co-operative Commonwealth Federation MPs
20th-century Canadian politicians
Members of the House of Commons of Canada from Saskatchewan
People from Weyburn
University of Saskatchewan alumni